Gurfateh Singh Pirzada (born 29 October 1996) is an Indian actor who works primarily in Hindi films and web series. He made his debut with Friends in Law in 2018. Pirzada has since starred in Hum Bhi Akele Tum Bhi Akele (2019) and Netflix thriller film Guilty (2020). In 2023, he was seen starring in the teen drama Netflix series Class.

Early life and family 
Pirzada was born on 29 October 1996 in Chandigarh, India in a Sikh family to an agriculturist and realtor father Gurlal Pirzada and a housewife mother Paramjit Kaur Pirzada. His sister Mehreen Pirzada is also an actress.

Filmography

Films

Web series

Music videos

Awards and nominations

References

1996 births
Living people
People from Chandigarh district

External links 
 

Indian actors
Actors in Hindi cinema
Living people